Drum Hat Buddha is a 2001 album by American folk duo Dave Carter and Tracy Grammer.

Track listing 
All songs written by Dave Carter.
 "Ordinary Town" – 2:48 
 "Tillman Co." – 3:26 
 "Disappearing Man" – 3:49 
 "The Power and Glory" – 2:45 
 "236–6132" – 3:04 
 "41 Thunderer" – 5:03 
 "Gentle Arms of Eden" – 3:03 
 "I Go Like the Raven" – 3:35 
 "Highway 80 (She's a Mighty Good Road)" – 2:23 
 "Love, the Magician" – 4:18 
 "Merlin's Lament" – 3:35 
 "Gentle Soldier of My Soul" – 3:28

Credits

External links 
 Music page at official Dave Carter and Tracy Grammer web site (lyrics and sound samples)
 Music page at official Tracy Grammer web site (lyrics and sound samples)

Notes and sources 

2001 albums
Dave Carter and Tracy Grammer albums
Tracy Grammer albums